Polish Architects Street is an alley located in the Sabail district of Baku, Azerbaijan. The alley was named after one of the alleys in the historic district of Baku in order to perpetuate the names of Polish architects.

About 
The alley is named in honor of Polish architects who worked in one of the historical neighborhoods of Baku. In one of the buildings there is a memorial plaque with the names of Polish architects - Józef Gosławski, Kazimir Skórewich, Józef Płoszko and Eugeniusz Skibiński, and stone carvings of Murtuza Mukhtarov's palace, Ismailiyya Palace, Baku City Executive Power building, Agabala Guliyev's House of which they were the architects were painted. The author of the memorial plaques is the Honored Architect of Azerbaijan Elbay Gasimzade. The nearest metro station to the alley is Sahil station.

References

Streets in Baku